Papilio moerneri is a rare species of butterfly in the family Papilionidae. It is endemic to New Ireland in Papua New Guinea. It may also occur on New Britain as a second subspecies, P. m. mayrhoferi was described from this island in 1939, but there have been no further confirmed sightings from this part of its range.

Sources
 

Insects of Papua New Guinea
moerneri
Taxonomy articles created by Polbot
Taxobox binomials not recognized by IUCN
Butterflies described in 1919